O17 may refer to:
 Consolidated O-17 Courier,  an observation aircraft of the United States National Guard
 Nevada County Air Park, in California, United States; formerly assigned FAA LID O17
 Oxygen-17, an isotope of oxygen